Doeskin is the split hide of an adult female deer with a velvet-like texture.  It is frequently used for the manufacture of gloves.  It accepts dye readily.

The term also refers to a tightly-woven medium-weight wool fabric with a short soft nap similar to duvetyn.

References

 Leather
Waulked textiles